Lin Cheng-yi is a Taiwanese politician. He was the deputy minister of the Mainland Affairs Council.

Education
Lin obtained his bachelor's and master's degrees from National Chengchi University in 1978 and 1982, respectively, and master's and doctoral degrees from University of Virginia in the United States in 1984 and 1987, respectively.

See also
 Cross-Strait relations

References

Living people
Political office-holders in the Republic of China on Taiwan
Year of birth missing (living people)